Carol Danvers is a fictional character portrayed primarily by Brie Larson in the Marvel Cinematic Universe (MCU) media franchise—based on the Marvel Comics character of the same name—commonly known by her alias, Captain Marvel. Danvers is depicted as a former U.S. Air Force fighter pilot who was given superhuman abilities when a light-speed engine test went wrong and she was exposed to the cosmic energy of the Tesseract. She was subsequently transformed into a Human-Kree hybrid via blood transfusion and renamed Vers. Initially loyal to the Kree Empire, she serves as a member of the Starforce in their war against the Skrulls, but eventually returns to Earth where she regains her memories. She unlocks her dormant powers including superhuman strength, energy projection and absorption, and flight. She befriends Nick Fury, inspiring him to create the Avengers Initiative. Decades later, she joins the Avengers and participates in the battles against Thanos.

, the character has appeared in three films, as well as the streaming series Ms. Marvel (2022). Alternate versions within the MCU multiverse appear in the animated series What If...? (2021), voiced by Alexandra Daniels.

Concept, creation and casting
Danvers originated as a comic book character in Marvel Super-Heroes #13 (March 1968) by writer Roy Thomas and artist Gene Colan. In the story, she is an officer in the United States Air Force and Security Chief of a restricted military base, where Danvers meets Dr. Walter Lawson, the human alias of alien Kree hero Captain Marvel. In a later story, Danvers is caught in the explosion of a Kree device after trying to get close to Captain Marvel. Although Captain Marvel manages to save her life, Danvers sustains serious injuries, later resurfacing with superhuman abilities and becoming the hero Ms. Marvel (created by writer Gerry Conway and artist John Buscema) in a self-titled series in January 1977, at first written by Gerry Conway and later by Chris Claremont. In the series, it is revealed that the energy exposure from the explosion of a device called the "Psyche-Magnetron" caused Danvers's genetic structure to meld with Captain Marvel's, effectively turning her into a human-Kree hybrid.

After her transformation as Ms. Marvel, Danvers as a character went through several developments throughout the years before becoming Captain Marvel. In the 1980s Danvers' stories are entangled with the mutants, which started when Rogue steals her powers and memories.<ref>Avengers Annual #10 (1981). Marvel Comics (New York).</ref> In Uncanny X-Men series by Chris Claremont and Dave Cockrum, Danvers forgoes her identity as Ms. Marvel and subsequently uses the name Binary after being experimented by the alien race the Brood which gives her the ability to generate the power of a star. However, in the 1990s Danvers loses the majority of her Binary power and regain her original power as Ms. Marvel. Writer Kurt Busiek and artist George Pérez then redefine her as Warbird as she joins the Avengers and fight against Kang the Conqueror. Afterwards, Danvers as Warbird continues to appear in major 2000s storylines such as, House of M, Civil War and Secret Invasion. During the Dark Reign storyline, Danvers returns as Ms. Marvel and fights against her imposter created by Norman Osborn.

After her introduction, Carol Danvers was meant to be an icon of feminist movement as shown by her superhero name and being portrayed as a strong character. However, push-back from Marvel's then Editor-in-Chief Jim Shooter instead set a precedent for stories centred on the theme of victimization, with some of her most formative arcs involving alcoholism, torture, brainwashing, identity/power theft, kidnapping, and rape. Although not the ideal struggles expected of a hero, her tendency to bounce back from attempts to write her off and overcome traumatic experiences all the stronger became a consistent theme itself. As such, her continuous appearances with Marvel's prominent characters throughout the decades turned Danvers into a premier heroine for the publisher. In 2010s, Danvers eventually assumed the title Captain Marvel in the series by Kelly Sue DeConnick with a redesigned costume closer to a flight suit rather than the classic female superhero appearance. She also rejoined the flagship Avengers series New Avengers and was involved in major storylines such as the 2015 Secret Wars and 2016 Civil War II, where she leads the side advocating for stopping crime and attacks before they happen.

Marvel Studios President Kevin Feige said Larson was cast because of her ability to balance the character's vast powers with her humanity. Due to concern that Larson (who was 26 when she was cast) was too young to portray an accomplished airman, screenwriter Nicole Perlman consulted with the U.S. Air Force, who said it was possible for someone to excel between the ages of 28 and 34.

Characterization

In the MCU, Danvers is an ex-U.S. Air Force fighter pilot and member of an elite Kree military unit called Starforce. She was imbued with superhuman strength, energy projection, and flight after exposure to Tesseract energy. Larson described Danvers as a "believer in truth and justice" and a "bridge between Earth and space", who must balance her unemotional Kree side with her "flawed" human half. Larson also called Danvers aggressive, quick-tempered, and invasive—attributes that help her in a fight but prove to be character flaws.
 
Brie Larson trained for nine months for the role, learning judo, boxing, and wrestling. She also visited Nellis Air Force Base and met with active-duty airmen, including Brigadier General Jeannie Leavitt and Thunderbirds pilot Major Stephen Del Bagno, in preparation for the role. Carol Danvers is portrayed as a thirteen-year-old by Mckenna Grace, and as a six-year-old by London Fuller.

In Avengers: Endgame, screenwriter Christopher Markus stated that Danvers's powers are on a scale that has not previously existed in the MCU and likened her personality to Steve Rogers, "which is sort of a person who's right and knows they're right and doesn't really want to hear it when you tell them they're wrong". Danvers has little screen time in the film, which McFeely reasoned as "not the story we're trying to tell—it's the original Avengers dealing with loss and coming to a conclusion, and she's the new, fresh blood." Larson filmed her scenes for Endgame before beginning work on her solo film Captain Marvel (2019), which was released first. Captain Marvel directors Anna Boden and Ryan Fleck were present for the filming of Larson's scenes in Endgame and gave Danvers's characterization in the film their blessing.

Fictional character biography
Origin and Kree–Skrull War

In 1995, on the Kree Empire's capital planet of Hala, Danvers, known as 'Vers', suffers from amnesia and recurring nightmares involving an older woman, particularly as a former U.S. Air Force test pilot who acquired cosmic energy force powers from the Tesseract after an explosion that wiped out her memory. The Kree decide to use her as a weapon against the Skrulls. Yon-Rogg, her mentor and commander, trains her to control her abilities while the Supreme Intelligence, the artificial intelligence that rules the Kree, urges her to keep her emotions in check.  During a mission to rescue an undercover operative infiltrating a group of Skrulls, Vers is captured by Skrull commander Talos. A probe of Vers's memories leads them to Earth. Vers escapes and crash-lands in Los Angeles. Her presence attracts S.H.I.E.L.D. agents Nick Fury and Phil Coulson, whose investigation is interrupted by a Skrull attack. Vers and Fury later go to the Project Pegasus installation at an Air Force base. They discover Vers was a pilot presumed to have died in 1989 while testing an experimental light-speed engine designed by Dr. Wendy Lawson, whom Vers recognizes as the woman from her nightmares. They fly to Louisiana to meet former pilot Maria Rambeau, the last person to see Vers and Lawson alive.

Rambeau and her daughter Monica reveal that Vers is Carol Danvers, who was once like family to them. Talos, arriving unarmed, explains that the Skrulls are refugees searching for a new home and that Lawson was Mar-Vell, a renegade Kree scientist helping them. Talos plays a recovered recording from Lawson's jet, prompting Danvers to remember the crash, whereby she absorbed the energy from the ensuing explosion, gaining powers but losing her memory. Devastated by the truth, she suffers a breakdown that Maria and Talos help her through.

Danvers, Talos, Fury, and Rambeau locate Lawson's cloaked laboratory orbiting Earth, where Lawson hid several Skrulls, including Talos' family, and the Tesseract - the power source of Lawson's engine. There, Danvers is captured by Starforce and interfaces with the Supreme Intelligence. Danvers removes the Kree implant that suppressed her powers during their conversation, allowing her to reach her full potential. In the subsequent battle, Fury retrieves Goose, who is revealed to be an alien called a Flerken. Goose swallows the Tesseract and scratches Fury, blinding his left eye. Danvers destroys a Kree bomber, forcing Kree officer Ronan the Accuser and his squadron to retreat before overpowering Yon-Rogg on Earth and sending him back to Hala with a warning to the Supreme Intelligence.

Danvers departs to help the Skrulls find a new home world, leaving Fury a modified pager to contact her in an emergency. Meanwhile, Fury drafts an initiative to locate and bring together heroes like Danvers.

Joining the Avengers and fighting Thanos

In 2018, Danvers is summoned via the pager by Fury during the Blip. Danvers returns to Earth and tracks the activated pager to the Avengers Compound where she meets Natasha Romanoff, Bruce Banner, James Rhodes, Rocket Raccoon, Steve Rogers, and Thor. She is then sent to rescue Tony Stark and Nebula who were aimlessly drifting in the Benatar through space and brings them back to the Compound. She is grief stricken when informed about the Blip and joins Banner, Nebula, Rhodes, Rocket, Rogers, Romanoff, and Thor in confronting Thanos on the Garden planet. Danvers assists in subduing him when he reveals that he has destroyed the Infinity Stones to prevent his mission from being undone. Danvers then watches as Thor decapitates Thanos.

In 2023, she has become a member of the Avengers under the leadership of Romanoff, involved in space missions helping to quash post-Blip chaos across the universe alongside Rocket and Nebula. Later, Danvers returns to Earth, after learning that the Avengers and their allies are engaged in battle with an alternate Thanos. She rescues them from a bombardment rained down from alternate Thanos' Sanctuary II warship and destroys it. She is then given the Nano Gauntlet and attempts to fly it into the Quantum Tunnel. However, she is stopped by Thanos, who incapacitates her with the Power Stone. Stark then sacrifices himself to win the battle, and Danvers later attends his funeral, reuniting with Fury in the process.

 Return to space 
 Meeting Shang-Chi 

In 2024, Danvers and Banner answer Wong's holographic call to discuss the Ten Rings with Shang-Chi and his friend Katy. While she does not recognize anything alien about the Ten Rings, they discover the Ten Rings are emitting unknown signals before Danvers receives another call and leaves.

 Swapped with Kamala Khan 

In 2025, Danvers swaps places with Kamala Khan after the latter's bangle emits a strange glow. After seeing Khan's bedroom, full of Captain Marvel merchandise, Danvers becomes worried and abruptly leaves.

Alternate versions

Several alternate versions of Danvers from within the MCU multiverse appear in the animated series What If...?, voiced by Alexandra Daniels.

Death of the Avengers

In an alternate 2011, Danvers is summoned by Fury to fight the Asgardian army led by Loki alongside Rogers following the death of the other Avengers Initiative candidates. During a battle on the Helicarrier, they are assisted by a Romanoff from another universe brought in by the Watcher.

Stopping Thor's party

In an alternate 2011, Danvers is summoned by Maria Hill to stop Thor's out-of-control intergalactic party. Danvers confronts Thor, but he refuses to leave and fights Danvers. Forced to hold back her power in order to avoid collateral damage, Danvers retreats and formulates a plan with S.H.I.E.L.D. to lure Thor to a remote region in Siberia. Before they can fight again, Frigga intervenes, prompting Thor to quickly repair the damages he and his partygoers conflicted across the planet; he and Danvers reconcile.

Ultron's conquest

In an alternate 2015, Danvers defends Xandar against Ultron after the android acquires the Infinity Stones. She drives him into the planet's core in an attempt to destroy him, but is killed when Ultron unleashes the Stones' full power.

Differences from the comics
In the comics, Carol goes by numerous superhero names before becoming Captain Marvel, with her first name being Ms. Marvel.

Furthermore, Carol Danvers received her powers through an exposure from an explosion of a Kree device called the "Psyche-Magnetron" while assisting Mar-Vell. The explosion caused her to mutate and becoming a human-Kree hybrid. In the Marvel Cinematic Universe (MCU) films, Carol received her powers from an energy exposure of an explosion when she destroyed a light-speed engine created by Mar-Vell. However, the energy comes from the Tesseract that housed one of the Infinity Stones, the Space Stone. She becomes a human-Kree hybrid later, when Yon-Rogg, a Kree officer, takes her to Hala and transfused his blood to her.

In the MCU, Carol's activities on Earth in 1995 and her call sign, "Avenger", are the inspirations for Nick Fury's Avengers Initiative that created the Avengers. Meanwhile, in the comics, the Avengers was created in response to Loki's invasion and was later named by the Wasp.

Reception
Following the release of Captain Marvel and Avengers: Endgame, A.O. Scott of The New York Times praised Carol Danvers's character, calling her a "tough and charming woman [... ] determined to fight gender clichés" who is "ready for a career of franchise clock-punching." Jacob Stalworthy of The Independent stated Carol Danvers has the potential to become "one of the best" characters from the MCU, saying, "Now her origin story is out of the way, the sky's the limit for her; it'll be exciting to see which planets her story scales next." Tara McNamara of Common Sense Media found Carol Danvers to be a positive role model, writing, "Carol Danvers is a fantastic role model: She always sees herself as capable, she's not objectified, male counterparts recognize her intelligence and strength, and she has a strong sense of integrity." Shana O'Neil of The Verge stated Captain Marvel depicts Carol Danvers as one of Marvel’s strongest superheroes and called her "an admirable person, one with good friends and goals worth fighting for." Amanda Finn of Ms. wrote, "When we watch Captain Marvel, we witness an incredibly strong and funny woman being told to reign in her emotions from the very start. The fact that she doesn’t immediately throw people around rooms just for the sake of smashing blatant misogyny is enough reason to keep watching. Captain Marvel is a level-headed person just trying to do her best with what she’s got. She wants to protect those that need protecting and complete her mission, and she manages to make that happen despite the sexism that comes her way."

Callie Ahlgrim of Insider ranked Carol Danvers 2nd in their "ranking of all the Avengers, from least to most powerful" list. Richard Fink of MovieWeb ranked Carol Danvers 3rd in their "Strongest MCU Heroes" list, saying, "Essentially, Captain Marvel is the MCU Superman, a powerhouse fighter with great strength. Captain Marvel will turn out the champion in any physical fight." Simoun Victor Redoblado of Collider included Carol Danvers and Captain Marvel in their "10 Best MCU Narratives About Female Characters" list, writing, "Carol Danvers is the personification of power. [...] Carol embraced the responsibility of using her powers to help civilizations across galaxies. Now that's a strong message sent."  Chris E. Hayne of GameSpot ranked Carol Danvers 15th in their "38 Marvel Cinematic Universe Superheroes" list, saying, "From her first '90s-soaked adventure through her appearance at the climax of Avengers: Endgame, we've got a good idea of how powerful Captain Marvel is. Power isn't everything, though, and after two appearances, we simply need more. That someone like Captain Marvel hasn't cracked the top 10 is telling. However, there's plenty more to come--namely The Marvels--that could improve her standing here." Hemal Jhaveri of USA Today ranked the relationship between Carol Danvers and Maria Rambeau 10th in their "Best relationships in the Marvel Cinematic Universe" list, stating, "As much as I love all things MCU, it is criminal that there are hardly any strong relationships between women in any of the movies until 2019’s Captain Marvel. It is an oversight steeped in misogyny and while I’m glad Marvel producers learned the errors of their ways, they still have a long, long way to go. That said, the relationship between Carol Danvers and Maria Rambeau is a great look at female friendship."

Larson's portrayal of Carol Danvers was praised by multiple critics. Meg Downey of IGN found Captain Marvel to be a refreshing take in the MCU, stating that Larson's portrayal of Carol Danvers is a "stellar performance" that manages to give the character "a vibrant, joyful life that will fit right into the future" of the MCU. Peter Bradshaw of The Guardian called Larson's performance "fierce" across Captain Marvel, stating, "Larson has the natural body language of a superhero: that mixture of innocence and insouciance, that continuous clear-eyed idealism and indignation combined with unreflective battle-readiness, all the things that give MCU films their addictive quality." Kenneth Turan of Los Angeles Times praised Brie Larson's performance as Carol Danvers, calling her "luminous and powerful [...] with a knockout punch that would have daunted Muhammad Ali." Owen Gleiberman of Variety stated Larson provides an "emotional vibrance" across the film, writing, "Brie Larson lights up a Marvel superheroine film from within."

However, the character and the movie have also been the target of negative attention due to Brie Larson's perceived feminism. Some have been critical of the character suffering from the "Superman problem," calling her "overpowered" and "unrelatable," with concerns raised over how to convincingly write the character into established MCU plotlines without turning her into a Mary Sue. Adrienne Tyler from ScreenRant defended Captain Marvel and Brie Larson against the backlash, calling it "ridiculous," and stating, "In the end, Captain Marvel became one of the highest-grossing films of 2019 and the first female-led superhero film to pass the billion-dollar mark, proving that trolls just won’t win no matter how hard they try." Christian Blauvelt of IndieWire also criticized the negative comments made against the character and the movie, saying that "It’s fascinating that a certain, very secure, social media obsessed contingent of male fandom, empowered by being given both a platform and relative anonymity, has appeared so very threatened by Captain Marvel." Amanda Finn of feminist magazine Ms. stated, "From the get go, Captain Marvel was going to have a hell of a time pleasing male fans, especially after the (debunked!) rumor that Brie Larson told white men the movie isn’t for them. [...] It’s telling that the same halfhearted “comic superfans” that cried aloud at Stan Lee’s appearance at the beginning of the film are the ones spitting venom at the film’s very existence. You can’t have it both ways. You can’t claim to adore the man who gave the world Marvel and yet demean the character that bears its name."

Accolades

 In other media 
Brie Larson reprises her role as Carol Danvers in the theme park attraction Avengers: Quantum Encounter on the Disney Wish cruise ship. She also reprises her role in the theme park attraction Avengers Assemble: Flight Force'' in Disneyland Paris.

Notes

References

See also
Characters of the Marvel Cinematic Universe

External links
 Carol Danvers on the Marvel Cinematic Universe Wiki
 

Avengers (film series)
Captain Marvel (film series)
Captain Marvel (Marvel Comics)
Female characters in film
Female characters in television
Fictional characters who can manipulate light
Fictional characters with absorption or parasitic abilities
Fictional characters with energy-manipulation abilities
Fictional characters with slowed ageing
Fictional characters with superhuman durability or invulnerability
Fictional defectors
Fictional extraterrestrial–human hybrids
Fictional female aviators
Fictional female captains
Fictional feminists and women's rights activists
Fictional fighter pilots
Fictional genocide survivors
Fictional military captains
Fictional people from the 20th-century
Fictional United States Air Force personnel
Fictional women soldiers and warriors
Film characters introduced in 2019
Kree
Marvel Cinematic Universe characters
Marvel Comics American superheroes
Marvel Comics characters who can move at superhuman speeds
Marvel Comics characters with accelerated healing
Marvel Comics characters with superhuman strength
Marvel Comics extraterrestrial superheroes
Marvel Comics female superheroes
Marvel Comics hybrids
Marvel Comics military personnel